The arnis tournament at the 2005 Southeast Asian Games was held on December 1, 2005 to December 4, 2005 at the Emilio Aguinaldo College Gymnasium in Ermita, Manila. This is also the same venue as the wushu events.
This is the first time since 1991 that the sport was introduced in the SEA Games, although in 1991 it was played as a demonstration sport.  Arnis is an indigenous sport that originated from the Philippines. This was the first international multi-sport event where East Timor received its first medal.

There were six gold medals at stake in Forms and Full-Contact events for men and women.

Participating countries

Whitley Bay

Medal table

Medalists

Forms

Full contact

External links
Southeast Asian Games Official Results
https://web.archive.org/web/20190703130445/http://www.arnisphilippines.com/  - Arnis Philippines, National Sporting Association and organizer for the event

2005 Southeast Asian Games events